Lifeline or Lifelines may refer to:

Support, care, and emergency services
 Crisis hotline
 Lifeline (crisis support service), Australia-based, now international
 National Suicide Prevention Lifeline, United States
 LifeLine (medical transport), a medical transport service associated with Indiana University Health system
 Lifeline of Ohio, organ procurement organization
 Lifeline project, a substance use disorder charity in Manchester
 Lifeline (safety), a fall protection safety device in the form of an open wire rope fence 
 Life Line Screening, a health screening company in the United States
 Lifeline utility, in New Zealand, an essential service during major emergencies
 Lifeline (FCC program), an FCC program for communications services for low-income consumers

Film
 The Life Line, a 1919 American silent drama film
 Life Line, a 1935 Hong Kong film
 Lifeline (film), a 1997 Hong Kong film by Johnny To

Music

Albums
 Life Line (album), by the George Adams-Don Pullen Quartet, 1981
 Lifeline (The Answering Machine album) or the title song, 2011
 Lifeline (Ben Harper album) or the title song, 2007
 Lifeline (Iris DeMent album), 2004
 Lifeline (Neal Morse album) or the title song, 2008
 Lifeline (Pablo Cruise album) or the title song, 1976
 Lifeline (Phillips, Craig and Dean album), 1994
 Lifeline (Roy Ayers album) or the title song, 1977
 Lifeline (EP), by Jesu, or the title song, 2007
 Lifeline, by RJ Thompson, 2020
 Lifelines (A-ha album) or the title song (see below), 2002
 Lifelines (Andrea Corr album), 2011
 Lifelines (Arild Andersen album) or the title song, 1981
 Lifelines (I Prevail album) or the title song, 2016
 Lifelines, a Peter, Paul and Mary album, 1995
 Lifelines: The Jimi Hendrix Story, 1990

Songs
 "Lifeline" (Brooke Fraser song), 2003
 "Lifeline" (Jamiroquai song), 2011
 "Lifeline" (Papa Roach song), 2009
 "Lifeline" (Spandau Ballet song), 1982
 "Lifelines" (song), by A-ha, 2002
 "Life Line", by 10cc from Bloody Tourists, 1978
 "Life Line", by Harry Nilsson from The Point!, 1970
 "Lifeline", by Anastacia from Resurrection, 2014
 "Lifeline", by Angels & Airwaves from I-Empire, 2007
 "Lifeline", by CeCe Peniston from Finally, 1992
 "Lifeline", by Imogen Heap from Sparks, 2014
 "Lifeline", by LeRoux, 1983
 "Lifeline", by Justin Jesso which represented Illinois in the American Song Contest

Television
 Lifeline (1978 TV series), a 1978–79 American documentary series
 Lifeline (2017 TV series), an American science fiction drama series
 Lifeline (Spanish TV series) (Pulsaciones), a 2017 thriller series
 Lifelines (TV series), a 1993–1996 Irish chat show
 "Life Line" (Star Trek Voyager), an episode
 "Lifeline" (The L Word), an episode
 "Lifeline" (Stargate Atlantis), an episode
 Lifeline, a help for answering a question in the game show Who Wants to Be a Millionaire?
 Lifeline, a Belgian WWII resistance group in the 1977 TV series Secret Army

Video games
 Lifeline (video game), a 2003 action-adventure game
 Lifeline (2015 video game), a text-based adventure mobile game
 "Lifeline", a 2014 DLC for the video game State of Decay
 Lifeline, a playable character in the game Apex Legends

Other arts and entertainment
 The Lifeline, a 1946 novel by Phyllis Bottome
 Lifeline (G.I. Joe), a fictional character in the G.I. Joe universe
 Lifeline Theatre, Chicago, Illinois, United States
 "Life-Line", a science fiction short story by Robert A. Heinlein
 The Life Line (painting), an 1884 painting by Winslow Homer
 Lifelines (literary journal), literary journal of Dartmouth College

Religious and humanitarian missions
 Life-Line (mission boat), a Baptist missionary boat in Coos Bay, Oregon, United States, 1914–23
 Lifeline (ship), formerly FRV Clupea, a UK small rescue boat and former fisheries research vessel
 Lifeline Expedition, a Christian initiative for reconciliation from the Atlantic slave trade
 Lifeline 3, from Britain to the Gaza Strip in 2006
 Lifeline Energy formerly Freeplay Foundation, a London-based NGO active in Africa
 Lifeline Malawi, a Calgary-based charity
 Lifeline Center for Child Development, a child psychiatry center in Queens, New York, United States

Other uses
 Lifeline program, a telephone financial-assistance program in the United States
 Kernmantle rope used for safety in rock climbing
 In sailing, ropes or netting around the edge of the sailboat to prevent people from falling off the boat
 Fall arrest a form of fall protection to prevent falling
 In palmistry, a particular crease in the palm
 LifeLines, genealogy freeware
 Lifeline (diving), or tether, a line from the diver to a tender at the surface

See also
 British Imperial Lifeline, aka All-Red Route, steamship route from Britain to India via the Suez Canal
 Chai Lifeline New York illness charity
 Lifeline Express, rail-based mobile hospital
 Operation Lifeline Sudan, consortium of UN agencies
 Southern Evacuation Lifeline, proposed freeway in South Carolina, United States